Meng Guanliang (born January 24, 1977, in Shaoxing, Zhejiang) is a Chinese former flatwater canoeist who has competed since 1998, the gold medalists at two Olympic Games, he won the Canadian canoe C-2 500 m gold medal both in 2004 and 2008.

As a competitive canoeist, Meng once announced his retirement at 2005 China National Games end, he made a comeback in October 2006, Meng officially announced retirement after the 2008 Beijing Olympics.

As Champions in two Olympic Games, Meng won much honour. He was the winners at the Best Group of CCTV Sports Personality Awards of Year 2008, the 2008 China Top Ten Benefiting Laureus Sports for Good, the 2008 most influential people in Zhengjiang. Meng was selected as the representative of 18th CCPC National Congress; he currently serves as the director at Water Sports Administration Center of Zhejiang
.

Career 
Meng became Chinese champion for the first time at the age of twenty. He has won a total of five gold medals at the Asian Championships (1998, 1999 (x3) and 2002).

His best world championship performance came in 2003 in Gainesville, USA. Meng reached two individual finals, finishing in fifth place in the C-1 500 m and sixth in the C-1 200 m.

For the 2004 season he formed a C-2 partnership with Yang Wenjun. On their first international appearance together in Komatsu, Japan, they shocked observers by posting a C-2 500 m time of 1:40.27. Then, in June, they won a World Cup race in Duisburg to establish themselves as one of the favourites for an Olympic medal.

At the 2004 Summer Olympics in Athens, they were drawn in the toughest heat alongside all the main medal contenders. They won the heat in a time of 1:38.916, almost a full second ahead of Cubans Rojas and Balceiro. The final was much closer with less than a second separating the first eight contenders but Meng and Yang again headed the Cuban pair to win the gold medal - China's first in the sport. They repeated their Olympic victory in Beijing four years later despite their boat capsizing at the finish line after their win.

References

 

1977 births
Living people
Sportspeople from Jiaxing
Chinese male canoeists
Olympic canoeists of China
Olympic gold medalists for China
Olympic medalists in canoeing
Medalists at the 2004 Summer Olympics
Canoeists at the 2004 Summer Olympics
Medalists at the 2008 Summer Olympics
Canoeists at the 2008 Summer Olympics
Asian Games medalists in canoeing
Canoeists at the 1998 Asian Games
Canoeists at the 2002 Asian Games
Asian Games gold medalists for China
Asian Games bronze medalists for China
Medalists at the 1998 Asian Games
Medalists at the 2002 Asian Games